Konvicted  is the second studio album by American singer Akon. It was released on November 14, 2006. The album features collaborations with rappers Eminem, Snoop Dogg, Styles P and T-Pain.

Background
Konvicted is Akon's most successful album worldwide. The album received three nominations for the Grammy Awards in two categories, Best Contemporary R&B Album and Best Rap/Sung Collaboration. On November 20, 2007, the RIAA certified the album ‘triple platinum’ with 3 million units sold in the US. It has sold more than 5 million copies worldwide. The album was accompanied by several different bonus tracks depending on territory. In the UK, the track "Gringo" was issued. "Gringo" also became a bonus track for Target customers in the US. In Japan, the UK B-Side "Struggle Everyday" became the final track on the album. "Struggle Everyday" also became a bonus track for Circuit City customers in the US. All digital versions of the album come accompanied by a remix of "I Wanna Love You", featuring Snoop Dogg and Eminem.

Walmart customers in the US were treated to four exclusive bonus tracks, including unreleased tracks "Fair to You" and "Still Alone", plus Walmart Live Soundcheck versions of "Mama Africa" and "I Wanna Love You". The Platinum Edition of the album, issued in 2007, came complete with the new single "Sorry Blame It On Me", a new track entitled "Rush", and a remix of "Don't Matter". Some editions of the album also came packaged with a bonus DVD, containing a thirty-minute documentary and three music videos. "Smack That", "I Wanna Love You" and "Don't Matter" were certified 3× platinum by RIAA. Also "Never Took the Time" was released as promotional single on October 16, 2007. Snoop Dogg, under the moniker Snoop Lion, recorded a cover of "Tired of Runnin'" for his debut reggae album, Reincarnated.

Chart performance
Konvicted debuted at number two on the Billboard 200 chart, selling over 284,000 copies that week. The album was able to stay within the top twenty for 28 consecutive weeks, but eventually started to drop slowly. On November 19, 2007, the RIAA certified Konvicted 3× platinum status with 3 million units sold in the United States. The album became the second best selling record of the year on the Billboard 200 charts.'

Track listing

Credits and personnel

Akon - production, executive producer, A&R direction
Devyne Stephens - executive producer, A&R direction, creative direction
Tasha Stafford - A&R administration
Jason "Chyld" Kpana - A&R administration, marketing
Eddy Schreyer - mastering
Elise Wright - marketing
Joe Spix - art direction, art design
Jonathan Mannion - photography
Fiskani - wardrobe stylist
Sandra L. Brown - legal
Cragg Brown - coordinator

Charts

Weekly charts

Year-end charts

Certifications

References
Note: All citations to magazine articles lead to a website where scans of these magazines can be viewed free of charge

2006 albums
Akon albums
Albums produced by Akon
Albums produced by T-Pain
Albums produced by Eminem
Universal Records albums